Annually, Angola loses about 124,800 hectares or 0.20% per year. In 1990-2010, the country had lost about 2,496,000 hectares or 4.1% in total.

Angola had a 2018 Forest Landscape Integrity Index mean score of 8.35/10, ranking it 23rd globally out of 172 countries.

History
Angola did the first inventory of its forest in 2008 with 199 samples.

Region
The provinces of Cabinda, Cuando Cubango, Moxico and Uíge have the highest level of forest exploitation for timber production.

References

Angola
Forestry in Angola